The 1924 Carnegie Tech Tartans football team was an American football team that represented the Carnegie Institute of Technology (now known as Carnegie Mellon University) during the 1924 college football season. Led by tenth-year head coach Walter Steffen, Carnegie Tech compiled a record of 5–4.

Schedule

References

Carnegie Tech
Carnegie Mellon Tartans football seasons
Carnegie Tech Tartans football